The Providence Friars men's lacrosse team represents Providence College in National Collegiate Athletic Association (NCAA) Division I college lacrosse. The program was created in 1980 and plays its home games at Anderson Stadium. The Friars have competed in the Big East men's lacrosse conference since 2010, previously competing in the Metro Atlantic Athletic Conference. Through 2019, the team has an all–time record of 243-310-1.

Providence won four regular season championships and made three NCAA tournament appearances as a member of the MAAC. The Friars made their first appearance in the NCAA men's lacrosse tournament in 2004, losing in the first round to Johns Hopkins by a score of 15-3. Since joining the Big East, the program has appeared in one Big East championship game, but were defeated by conference rival Marquette 10-9 on their home field in Providence.

Season Results
The following is a list of Providence's results by season as an NCAA Division I program:

{| class="wikitable"

|- align="center"

†NCAA canceled 2020 collegiate activities due to the COVID-19 virus.

References

External links
 

NCAA Division I men's lacrosse teams
College men's lacrosse teams in the United States
Lacrosse, men's
Big East Conference men's lacrosse
1980 establishments in Rhode Island
Lacrosse clubs established in 1980